Kelleria is a genus of cyclopoid copepods in the family Kelleriidae, the sole genus in the family. There are about 19 described species in Kelleria.

Species
These 19 species belong to the genus Kelleria:

 Kelleria andamanensis Sewell, 1949
 Kelleria australiensis Bayly, 1971
 Kelleria camortensis Sewell, 1949
 Kelleria corioensis Arnott & McKinnon, 1981
 Kelleria gradata Stock, 1967
 Kelleria grandisetiger Kim I.H., 2006
 Kelleria gurneyi Sewell, 1949
 Kelleria indonesiana Mulyadi, 2009
 Kelleria javaensis Mulyadi, 2009
 Kelleria multiovigera Kim I.H., 2009
 Kelleria pectinata (Scott A., 1909)
 Kelleria portiviva Kim I.H., 2006
 Kelleria propinquus (Scott T., 1894)
 Kelleria purpurocincta Gurney, 1927
 Kelleria reducta Gómez, 2006
 Kelleria regalis Gurney, 1927
 Kelleria rubimaculata Krishnaswamy, 1952
 Kelleria undecidentata Kim I.H., 2006
 Kelleria vaga Kim I.H., 2000

References

Cyclopoida
Copepod genera